Bandamadji-Ladomba is a village on the island of Grande Comore (Ngazidja) in the Comoros. According to the 1991 census, the village had a population of 1313.

References

Populated places in Grande Comore